Styled to Rock was an American reality competition television series based on the British television series of the same name, executive produced by recording artist Rihanna which focuses on fashion design. The contestants would compete with each other to create the best outfit for one or more famous music acts every week, restricted by time and materials. Their designs were judged and the music act of the week would choose their favourite one, and one designer was eliminated each week.

The series was originally scheduled to debut on November 5, 2013, on the now defunct Style Network. However two weeks before its September 23, 2013 debut, the Esquire Network was announced as taking over Style's channel space, rather than G4 as originally planned. It was announced on September 30, 2013, that the series would premiere October 25, 2013, on Bravo.

The show was cancelled after just one season due to low viewership and Rihanna's busy schedule.

Format
Similar to Project Runway, the series was also looking for new designers to create fashion for A-list celebrities in the world. Supported by their mentors, the candidates who were chosen as well as the mentors all by Rihanna personally, would fight in a weekly battle for the final. Weekly, the candidates would design outfits for one or more music celebrities. Normally the celebrities select the winners outfit by themselves. Every week produced a winner and two bottom contestants who would have to assert themselves verbally, until finally the worst of the week was eliminated. In the final, the two best designers would fight to win a $100,000 cash prize, a fashion feature in Glamour magazine and the chance to become the next member of Rihanna's design team.

On May 15, 2013, it was announced that American singer and fashion designer Pharrell Williams would serve as one of the mentors on the series. Five days later on May 20, 2013, it was revealed that American model Erin Wasson joined the series as another mentor. Mel Ottenberg was announced as the third and final mentor on May 29, 2013.

Contestants

: Age at the time of filming.

Challenges

 Gold background and WINNER means the designer won Styled to Rock.
 Silver background and RUNNER-UP means the designer was the runner-up on Styled to Rock.
 Blue background and WIN means the designer won that challenge.
 Turquoise background and HIGH means the designer was in the top looks for that challenge.
 Tan background and SAFE means the designer was safe from elimination, but wasn't one of the top looks.
 Orange background and BTM2 means the designer was in the bottom two (or more), but was not eliminated.
 Red background and ELIM means the designer lost and was eliminated of the competition.

Episodes

References

External links 

 
 
 

2010s American reality television series
2013 American television series debuts
2013 American television series endings
English-language television shows
Fashion-themed reality television series
Bravo (American TV network) original programming
Rihanna